Benjamin Stewart Darbyshire (13 June 1845 – 18 January 1907) was an English first-class cricketer and clergyman.

The son of Benjamin Darbyshire senior, he was born in June 1845 in West Derby, Lancashire (now Liverpool). He later studied at Wadham College at the University of Oxford. While studying at Oxford, he made two appearances in first-class cricket for Oxford University against the Marylebone Cricket Club in 1864 and 66, with both matches played at Oxford. In the 1864 fixture, he took a five wicket haul. After graduating from Oxford, Darbyshire took holy orders in the Church of England. He was the canon of St Paul's Church, Sheffield from 1868–70, before assuming the post of vicar for Blundellsands from 1870. In 1879, he was made a temporary chaplain in the 36th West Riding of Yorkshire Corps. Darbyshire died in January 1907 at Birkdale, Lancashire. His nephew, Cecil Moon, also played first-class cricket.

References

External links

1845 births
1907 deaths
Cricketers from Liverpool
People from West Derby
Alumni of Wadham College, Oxford
English cricketers
Oxford University cricketers
19th-century English Anglican priests
English military chaplains
20th-century English Anglican priests